Csobánka is a village in Pest County, Budapest metropolitan area, Hungary. Csobánka is located in the Pilis Mountains which is a National Park in Hungary.

The name Csobánka comes from Ottoman Turkish چوبان (çoban) rooted in < Persian چوبان (čubân). which means shepherd. The word csobán originated from the settlement of the Magyars in Hungary. The earliest record of the official name was mentioned in a tax minute-book on January 3, 1698.

Twin towns – sister cities

Csobánka is twinned with:
 Wertheim, Germany (1992)

References

External links
Official website of Csobánka (in Hungarian)

Populated places in Pest County
Budapest metropolitan area
Serb communities in Hungary